John Carr House, also known as Daniel Bostwick House, is a historic home located at Middlesex in Yates County, New York. It is a Greek Revival style structure built about 1847.

It was listed on the National Register of Historic Places in 1994.

References

Houses on the National Register of Historic Places in New York (state)
Greek Revival houses in New York (state)
Houses completed in 1847
Houses in Yates County, New York
1847 establishments in New York (state)
National Register of Historic Places in Yates County, New York